Alfie Hewett and Gordon Reid defeated the defending champions Gustavo Fernández and Shingo Kunieda in the final, 7–6(7–4), 1–6, [10–3] to win the men's doubles wheelchair tennis title at the 2020 French Open. With the win, Hewett completed the career Grand Slam.

Seeds

Draw

Finals

References

External Links
 Draw

Wheelchair Men's Doubles
French Open, 2020 Men's Doubles